Rossendale and Darwen is a constituency in Lancashire represented in the House of Commons of the UK Parliament since 2010 by Sir Jake Berry, the former Chairman of the Conservative Party.

Boundaries

1983 to 1997: The Borough of Rossendale, and the Borough of Blackburn wards of Earcroft, Marsh House, North Turton, Sudell, Sunnyhurst, and Whitehall.

1997 to 2010: All the wards of the Borough of Rossendale except the Greenfield and Worsley wards, and the Borough of Blackburn wards of Earcroft, Marsh House, North Turton, Sudell, Sunnyhurst, and Whitehall.

2010 to present: The Borough of Rossendale wards of Cribden, Eden, Facit and Shawforth, Goodshaw, Greensclough, Hareholme, Healey and Whitworth, Helmshore, Irwell, Longholme, Stacksteads, and Whitewell, and the Borough of Blackburn with Darwen wards of Earcroft, East Rural, Fernhurst, Marsh House, North Turton with Tockholes, Sudell, Sunnyhurst, and Whitehall.

Proposed Boundary Changes  For the next general election, it is proposed that Fernhurst ward will be moved to Blackburn constituency and Worsley, and Greenfield wards will move from Hyndburn back to Rossendale and Darwen constituency. This is subject to confirmation.

Darwen Ward Changes At the 2018 local elections the Darwen electoral wards were changed and re named. They are now known as Darwen West, Darwen East, Darwen South and West Pennine. Fernhurst ward is now part of Blackburn South and Lower Darwen which is part of the Blackburn constituency.

Constituency profile
The constituency consists of Census Output Areas of two local government districts with similar characteristics: a working population whose income is close to the national average but varying reliance upon social housing in relative terms to the national average.  At the end of 2012 the unemployment rate in the constituency stood as 3.5% of the population claiming jobseekers allowance, compared to the regional average of 4.2%.

The borough of Rossendale that contributes to the bulk of the population has a 21.5% of its population without a car, whereas this is 30.5% in Blackburn and outside of the seat in Burnley is 32.3%.  A relatively high 24% of Rossendale's population were in 2001 without qualifications and a high 25.1% were with level 4 qualifications or above.  A higher share, 28.7% of Blackburn's population lacked qualifications, however 19.8% of its population had Level 4 qualifications or above.

In terms of tenure 69.6% of homes are owned outright or on a mortgage as at the 2011 census across the Rossendale district; this compares to a similar 63.7% across Blackburn.  Whereas in Ribble Valley to the north 76.6% of homes fall within this category, in Leeds the figure is 58.2% and in Manchester just 37.8%.

History
This constituency was created in 1983 and has alternated between the two largest parties' MPs during this time; since 1997 the constituency has been a bellwether of the national result.

Members of Parliament

Elections

Elections in the 2010s

Elections in the 2000s

Elections in the 1990s

Elections in the 1980s

See also
List of parliamentary constituencies in Lancashire

Notes

References

Parliamentary constituencies in North West England
Constituencies of the Parliament of the United Kingdom established in 1983
Politics of Blackburn with Darwen